Avigliano Umbro is a comune (municipality) in the Province of Terni in the Italian region Umbria, located about 50 km south of Perugia and about 20 km northwest of Terni. As of 2011 census its population was of 2,568.
 
The municipality borders with Acquasparta, Amelia Guardea, Montecastrilli, Montecchio, and Todi, this one in the Province of Perugia.

References

External links

Official website  
Pro Loco Avigliano Umbro (Office of Tourism)  

Cities and towns in Umbria